Valere or Valère may refer to:

People
Valère Amoussou (born 1987), Beninese football player
Valère Billen (born 1952), Belgian football coach
Valère Germain (born 1990), French football player
Valère Gille (born 1867), Belgian poet
Valère Guillet (1796–1881), notary and political figure in colonial Quebec
Valère de Langres or Saint Valère (died 411), archdeacon of Langres
Valère Ollivier (1921–1958), Belgian racing cyclist
Valère Regnault (1545–1623), French Jesuit theologian
Alfred-Valère Roy (1870–1942), Canadian politician
Valère Somé (1950–2017), politician and scholar from Burkina Faso
Valere Van Sweevelt (born 1947), Belgian former racing cyclist
Valère Thiébaud (born 1999), Swiss racing cyclist
Simone Valère (1923–2010), French actress
Valérie Valère (1961–1981), French writer
Gabriel Valère Eteka Yemet, Congolese politician, First Secretary of the National Assembly 2012–7

Places and structures
Valère Basilica, fortified church in Sion, Valais, Switzerland
Valere, Torbeck, Haiti, village in the Les Cayes Arrondissement, in the Sud department of Haiti
Saint-Valère, Quebec, municipality located in the Centre-du-Québec region of Quebec, Canada

Other
Valere Power (Eltek), global electric power conversion specialist

See also
Horn of Valere, artefact in The Wheel of Time series of fantasy novels by American author James Oliver Rigney Jr., under his pen name of Robert Jordan
Groslot de Valere, a red French wine grape variety that is grown primarily in the Loire Valley of France
Valerie (disambiguation)
Valeriev
Valernes
Vallière
Vallières (disambiguation)
Vallères